Curral Velho is a municipality in the micro-region of Itaporanga in the Brazilian state of Paraíba. The population is 2,512 (2020 est.) in an area of 222.96 km². The elevation is 338 m.

References

External links
https://web.archive.org/web/20050828003842/http://www.citybrazil.com.br/pb/curralvelho/ 

Municipalities in Paraíba